Chomphu is a subdistrict in the Noen Maprang District of Phitsanulok Province, Thailand.

Geography
The subdistrict lies within the Nan Basin, which is part of the Chao Phraya Watershed.

Administration
The following is a list of the subdistrict's mubans, which roughly correspond to villages:

References

Tambon of Phitsanulok province
Populated places in Phitsanulok province